Aquinas Tunde Akinlosotu (born January 21, 1998) is an American professional soccer player who plays as a forward.

Club career
Born into a soccer family, Akinlosotu began playing organized youth soccer when he was six-years old. Growing up, Akinlosotu also played basketball and ran for his school's track team. In July 2014, Akinlosotu was part of the Baltimore Celtic side which won the boys under-16 US Youth Soccer national championship. He scored one of the goals in the final against OP Eagles Green of Ohio. While playing for Celtic, Akinlosotu also participated with his high school team, the McDonogh School. In September 2014, Akinlosotu was named among the top 10 players to watch for the upcoming high school season. He was also being recruited for college soccer by the Wake Forest Demon Deacons, Georgetown Hoyas, NC State Wolfpack, and Clemson Tigers.

In 2016, Akinlosotu decided to attend George Mason University and play for the George Mason Patriots. He decided to join the Patriots due to the school's connection to Washington D.C. and Major League Soccer side D.C. United. While at George Mason, Akinlosotu was coached by former MLS Coach of the Year Greg Andrulis. During the college offseason, Akinlosotu played in the National Premier Soccer League for FC Baltimore Christos and The Villages of USL League Two.

After graduating from George Mason, Akinlosotu was to have a trial with USL League One side South Georgia Tormenta, however the COVID-19 pandemic postponed the league. Finally, on September 8, 2020, it was announced that Akinlosotu has signed with Tormenta. He made his professional debut for the club on September 11, 2020 against Union Omaha. He came on as a 77th minute substitute as the match ended 2–2.

On March 21, 2022, Akinlosotu joined USL League One side Central Valley Fuego ahead of their inaugural season.

Career statistics

Club

References

External links
Profile at the South Georgia Tormenta website

1998 births
Living people
American soccer players
Association football midfielders
National Premier Soccer League players
People from Bowie, Maryland
Soccer players from Maryland
The Villages SC players
Tormenta FC players
Maryland Bobcats FC players
Central Valley Fuego FC players
USL League One players
USL League Two players
National Independent Soccer Association players